Seydimli  (also, Seyidimli and Seidimli) is a village and municipality in the Tartar Rayon of Azerbaijan.  It has a population of 2,495.

References 

Populated places in Tartar District